Aegires hapsis is a species of sea slug. It is a dorid nudibranch, a shell-less marine gastropod mollusc in the family Aegiridae.

Distribution 
This species was described from Horseshoe Cliffs, Okinawa, Ryukyu Islands. It has also been reported from Queensland, Australia and probably has a wider Indo-Pacific distribution.

References

Aegiridae
Gastropods described in 2004